Harry Bauer Rodrigues (born April 30, 1989), known professionally as Baauer, is an American record producer and DJ, best known for his double platinum song "Harlem Shake".

He has produced varied dance music from the age of 13 and previously produced a track under the name “Captain Harry” which received support on BBC Radio 1. His early releases as Baauer around 2012 were part of an emerging sub genre of electronic music known as trap, alongside acts like TNGHT, RL Grime, Rustie and Flosstradamus.

Baauer has produced songs for Just Blaze, Pusha T, Tom Morello and G-Dragon amongst others. He has created official remixes for Nero, The Prodigy, Flosstradamus, No Doubt, Missy Elliott, Disclosure, Kodak Black and Gorillaz. Baauer's music has been used in a number of blockbuster films including Hunger Games: Mockingjay, Red Sparrow and Logan.

In 2016, he released his debut album, Aa. His second album Planet's Mad was released on June 19, 2020. Planet's Mad received a nomination for Best Dance/Electronic Album in the 2021 Grammy Awards.

Background
Baauer was born in Philadelphia, Pennsylvania, and grew up in Germany, London, and Connecticut. He graduated from Staples High School before attending college in New York. He is of Portuguese and Jewish descent.

Career

"Harlem Shake"

His first official single "Harlem Shake", was released on Mad Decent subsidiary Jeffrees as a free giveaway offered via SoundCloud on May 22, 2012. It was first played by Rustie in his BBC Radio 1 essential mix before being given Pitchforks Best New Track distinction. The rapper El-P recorded a freestyle over the track for Pitchfork TV.

In the months following, online comedian and musician George Miller, known by his stage name Joji, recorded a video dancing to the song with his friends, which consequently grew into a YouTube viral video sensation as thousands of fans, artists, personalities and brands filmed their own versions to the track. Key videos were recorded by Good Morning America and The Simpsons.

After a change to the Billboard chart rules in 2013, "Harlem Shake" became the first US number 1 produced exclusively by streaming. YouTube produced an Easter egg customisation for the song, where their user interface would appear to shake at the start of the first verse. "Harlem Shake" is certified double platinum in the United States. At the time of releasing his debut album Aa in 2016, Baauer, Adele and Drake held the record for top streams achieved in a week. "Harlem Shake" won Dance Song of the Year and EDM Song of the Year at the 2013 Billboard Music Awards.

First EPs
In August 2012 Baauer signed to the LuckyMe record label and released his debut EP Dum Dum, and in 2014 the follow up EP ß.

Aa

Baauer released his debut album, Aa (pronounced "double a") via LuckyMe on March 18, 2016. It has guest features by Future, G-Dragon, Leikeli47, M.I.A., Novelist, Pusha T, Rustie, Tirzah and TT the Artist. The album was announced by Stephen Colbert on The Late Show on January 27, 2016; Baauer's performance subverted the format of conventional late night TV performances as he sat on the guest sofa and pressed spacebar on his laptop to queue the live performance of rapper Leikeli47. LuckyMe partnered with Apple Music to create and distribute music videos for Aa by Hiro Murai.

2016
In addition to his debut album in 2016 Baauer also scored a catwalk show for Alexander Wang and played parties for the fashion designer in New York alongside G-Dragon of the K-pop act Big Bang. He also featured as a model in the "Wangang" campaign. Also in 2016, Baauer's track "Horns" soundtracked Budweiser's Super Bowl campaign.

2018
In 2018, he released four standalone singles, "3AM" featuring AJ Tracey & Jae Stephens on July 12. Followed by "Hate Me", featuring virtual influencer Lil Miquela on August 17. Baauer appeared on Spotify's Times Square Billboard in promotion of the track. This was followed on October 23 by "Company" featuring Soleima, which premiered with Zane Lowe on Apple Music. The video by Jonathan Zawada premiered with Pitchfork. Baauer then released "Tep Tep" on December 13 as part of the LuckyMe advent calendar series.

Also in 2018, Baauer composed the music for the second season of the Marvel/Netflix series Iron Fist.

2019
In 2019 he featured on two songs on Rico Nasty's Anger Management mixtape, alongside the Atlanta hip hop duo Earth Gang. The tracks were co-produced by Kenny Beats.

Baauer's music was also featured in numerous campaigns and video games this year, including FIFA 20 and with an original song for Grand Theft Auto Online alongside Danny Brown and Channel Tres. Baauer's track "GoGo!" was used in a 2018 trailer for the League of Legends European Championship. His track "3AM" was later featured as theme music on KSI's YouTube.

Planet's Mad
In 2020 Baauer announced his second album Planet's Mad for release on June 5, 2020, via LuckyMe. It was later delayed to June 19, 2020. He announced the title track as the first single with an animated video directed by Actual Objects Studio, receiving a Vimeo Staff Pick. "Planet's Mad" was also used in a Vauxhall car commercial.

Discography

Studio albums

Extended plays

Singles

As lead artist

As featured artist

Remixes
2012
 Krueger – "Talk" (Baauer Remix)
 Abel – "Girls" (Baauer Remix)
 Obey City – "Neva Knew" (Baauer Remix)
 Flosstradamus – "Rollup" (Baauer Remix)
 Ryan Hemsworth – "Slurring" (Baauer Remix)
 No Doubt – Settle Down" (Baauer Remix)
 Nero – "Won't You (Be There)" (Baauer Remix)
 The Prodigy – "Mindfields" (Baauer Remix)
 Brick + Mortar – "Move to the Ocean" (Baauer Remix)
 First Aid Kit – "Winter Is All Over You" (Baauer Remix)

2013
 AlunaGeorge – "Attracting Flies" (Baauer Remix)
 Disclosure featuring Eliza Doolittle – "You & Me" (Baauer Remix)

2014
 What So Not and RL Grime – "Tell Me" (Baauer Edit)

2015
 James Newton Howard featuring Jennifer Lawrence – "Deep in the Meadow" (Baauer Remix)
 Shlohmo – "Ten Days of Falling" (Baauer Remix)

2017
 Flume – "Numb & Getting Colder" (Baauer Remix)
 Gorillaz – "Saturnz Barz" (Baauer Remix)
 alt-J – "In Cold Blood" (Baauer Remix)

2019
 HOLLY – "Strip Money" (Baauer Remix)

2021
 Alice Longyu Gao featuring Mura Masa and Bülow – "She Abunai" (Baauer Remix)
 A. G. Cook – "Beautiful Superstar" (Baauer Remix)

References

External links
 
 

1989 births
Living people
American musicians of Portuguese descent
American people of Austrian-Jewish descent
American electronic musicians
American dance musicians
Jewish American musicians
Musicians from Brooklyn
People from Westport, Connecticut
American hip hop record producers
21st-century American musicians
Musicians from Philadelphia
Trap musicians (EDM)
Record producers from New York (state)
Record producers from Pennsylvania
21st-century American male musicians
Staples High School alumni
American electronic dance music DJs
Remixers
21st-century American Jews